Stetson University is a private university with four colleges and schools located across the I–4 corridor in Central Florida with the primary undergraduate campus in DeLand. The university was founded in 1883 and was later established in 1887. In total, there are over 4,000 students currently enrolled at Stetson.

History

Stetson University was founded in 1883 and was first known as DeLand Academy, after the principal founder of the town, Henry Addison DeLand. In 1889, the name was changed to John B. Stetson University to honor the well-known hat manufacturer who made generous donations to Stetson. John B. Stetson was a benefactor to the university and served alongside Henry A. DeLand as a founding trustee.

The first director of the academy was Dr. John H Griffith, a minister. When the college was founded, Dr. John Franklin Forbes took over as the first President. Until 1995, Stetson had an affiliation with the Florida Baptist Convention and was considered a “Baptist school.”

Campus

Stetson University is located roughly halfway between Orlando and Daytona Beach, Florida in a town called DeLand, Florida. The main campus sits just north of the downtown area. The DeLand campus is home to the university's College of Arts and Sciences, School of Business Administration, School of Music, and most graduate programs.

The  campus in DeLand is nationally designated by the National Register of Historic Places as the Stetson University Campus Historic District for Florida's oldest collection of education-related buildings.

DeLand Hall opened in 1884. The original cost of the building was $4,000. DeLand Hall was known as the first academic building on campus. Today, it is known as the oldest building in Florida in continuous use for higher education. DeLand Hall houses the Office of the President and the offices of other administrators.

Lynn Business Center is home for the university's School of Business. The Lynn Business Center is known on campus as the LBC. Constructed in 2003, Stetson's Lynn Business Center earned LEED certification and became not only Stetson's first green building on campus, but also the first green building in the state of Florida.

Elizabeth Hall, houses a number of departments in the College of Arts and Sciences. The South end of the building is home to the Lee Chapel. Elizabeth Hall is an official symbol of the undergraduate campus. The name Elizabeth Hall came from founder John B. Stetson's wife, Elizabeth. Designed after Independence Hall in Philadelphia, the building is three stories of patterned brick, with a four-story central brick pavilion topped by a snowy white cupola. The building had once served as the college of natural sciences, as well as the library before the introduction of Sampson Hall, which held the books until the Dupont-Ball library was constructed. Currently, the building houses the offices of the faculty and the philosophy department, the department of political science, and the economics department on the first floor. The first floor also houses the Brown Center for Teaching Excellence, made possible by a multimillion-dollar gift from board members Hyatt and CiCi Brown.

Lee Chapel  is located in the historic Elizabeth Hall. It is a 100-year-old performance hall that seats 700 in an intimate setting. The acoustical properties are well-suited for classical music performances. It was built in 1897 and dedicated to the memory of John B. Stetson's late son, Ben, who died at age 6. It is currently named after H. Douglas Lee, who served as Stetson's eighth president from 1987 until 2009. It accommodates up to 787 people. William Sharp, an art professor, designed all the stained glass windows in the chapel. The organ is a 1961 Beckerath Organ. It is made up of 2,548 pipes and came here in 56 crates from Hamburg, Germany. It took three men two months to build. Along with many Stetson musicians and renowned traveling musicians; William Jennings Bryan, Ralph Nader, Jimmy Carter, Robert Frost, and Desmond Tutu are among the notables who have spoken in Lee Chapel.

Recent Enhancements 
In 2018, Stetson University announced a $18 million donation to construct a new science building on the DeLand campus and enhance science programs. This donation was made by Hyatt and Cici Brown. Prior to that, over $17 million in new construction took place at the DeLand campus to create the Rinker Welcome Center, Carlton Union Building, among many other things.

The Stetson University College of Law,  was founded in 1900 in DeLand. It was closed from 1942 to 1946 due to the Second World War. In 1954, the law school was relocated to Gulfport, Florida where Stetson Law still exists today. The Stetson University College of Law was the first law school in Florida.

Smoke-Free Campus
The residential campuses in DeLand and Gulfport became smoke-free and tobacco-free on Aug. 1, 2014.

Filming Location  Stetson's DeLand campus has been used as a set for a number of films and television shows. These include the Adam Sandler film The Waterboy, Ghost Story, From Earth to the Moon, First of May, Estás nominado: Cuando la realidad supera a la ficción, and "Walt Before Mickey."

Housing and residential life
There are many residence halls at Stetson University's DeLand campus. These include:

 Carson-Hollis Hall
 Chaudoin Hall
 Conrad Hall
 Emily Hall
 Gordis Hall
 Hatter Hall
 Houses 1-7 (which include sororities)
 Houses A-F (which include fraternities)
 Nemec Hall
 Plymouth Apartments
 Smith Hall
 Stetson Cove Apartments
 Stetson Oaks Apartments
 Stetson Palms Apartments
 University Hall (U-Hall)
 University Village Apartments (UVA)

Academics
Stetson University offers more than 55 majors and minors leading to the Bachelor of Arts (B.A), Bachelor of Science (B.S.), Bachelor of Music (B.M.), Bachelor of Music Education (B.M.E.), and Bachelor of Business Administration (B.B.A.) degree.  There are 18 graduate programs in Business, Law, Education, Counseling, and Master of Fine Arts. The Juris Doctor and Master of Laws are offered by the Stetson College of Law, which guarantees admission to Stetson graduates who meet certain academic requirements. Dual degree programs are offered in law and business administration, and in pharmacy and business administration.

The university is accredited by the Commission on Colleges of the Southern Association of Colleges and Schools.  The student-faculty ratio is 12–1. Total full-time faculty in all Stetson's colleges and schools is 265.

College of Arts and Sciences
The College of Arts and Sciences is the liberal arts heart of the university, with 19 academic departments and several interdisciplinary programs. The College of Arts and Sciences is the largest college on campus in terms of total undergraduate majors and total number of faculty. The College of Arts and Sciences is the largest and most diverse of Stetson University's colleges and schools; it includes the humanities, natural sciences, social sciences, education and the arts. There is a student to faculty ratio of 12:1.

School of Music
Rated one of the finest undergraduate-only music schools in the country, Florida's first collegiate school of music has an enduring tradition of top-notch instruction. Its small size allows an intimate atmosphere and interaction between students and faculty. There is a select enrollment of just over 300 majors and minors and 52 artist-scholar faculty. Performance opportunities for students include the symphony orchestra, band, choirs, opera, musical theater, jazz, chamber music, and solo recitals. The curriculum includes degree options in performance, education, theory, and composition. Music students may combine music study with business, pre-law, and many other fields. The School of Music has been an accredited member of the National Association of Schools of Music since 1938, and is included in Parade Magazines national "College A-List" in the category highlighting Arts Programs

Music students can opt for the Bachelor of Music in Music Technology, and a Bachelor of Arts in Digital Arts-Sound is also available.  Through the collaboration of the music and business schools, students can earn an undergraduate music degree and a graduate business degree in five years.

School of Business Administration
The School of Business Administration opened its doors in 1897 and today is one of 178 business schools worldwide to be accredited in both accounting and business by the Association to Advance Collegiate Schools of Business (A.A.C.S.B.). The School of Business Administration features a range of traditional and non-traditional majors.  Each major offers a customized field of study for a specific business discipline. Undergraduate majors include accounting, management, finance, international business, management information systems, marketing, family business, and general business. Masters programs include MBA, EMBA, and MAcc. The accounting program is one of only 182 worldwide that is accredited by AACSB International. The School of Business Administration is recognized by The Princeton Review as a Best Business School (Southeast).

College of Law

Florida's first law school, the ABA-accredited College of Law has educated lawyers, judges and community leaders for over a century. Consistently placing in the top tier in achievement for trial advocacy and legal writing, the college has been a member of the Association of American Law Schools since 1931.

Libraries
duPont-Ball Library

The library provides 3D scanning and printing, Google Glass, a variety of tablets, and lifeloggers (small wearable cameras that shoot high-definition photos that can be streamed live across the Internet). In addition, the library's databases provide access to 50,000 full-text journals, magazines and newspapers. As of October 2022, the library's physical collection contains 934,251 items organized by Library of Congress Classification. 

The Stetson University Archives include memorabilia, photographs, yearbooks, newsletters and other documents related to the university's history. The archives also contain special collections not directly related to the university's history, including the Treasure Collection of Rare Books, the Max Cleland Collection, the Regar collection, and the Greenlaw Collection, which includes signed, first-edition children's books.

The duPont-Ball Library also keeps a collection of government documents. It is the oldest federal depository in Florida, established in 1887. The library has been receiving State of Florida publications since 1968. The federal and Florida government documents depository collections are accessible to the general public at no charge and without restriction. Some of the federal, and all of the state, documents are listed in the library's online catalog. Those that are not accessible through the catalog are accessible through their online subscription databases.

The library also houses the Innovation Lab, a makerspace for students, faculty and staff to use to create projects for classes, labs, research projects, or just for fun. The Innovation Lab features 3D printers, virtual reality technology, and workstations for soldering, woodworking, sewing, and more.

Dolly & Homer Hand Law Library

The Stetson University College of Law libraries in Gulfport and Tampa support the research efforts of students, faculty, staff, bench and bar. The Gulfport campus library is open to the public. The combined collections of statutes, court reports, journals and treatises, in a variety of formats, is above the median size of academic law libraries in the United States.

Early History

Before the first library was established in 1887, DeLand University had started to accumulate a small collection of books. At this time, fewer than 1,300 volumes were housed on bookshelves in Deland Hall, sharing space with the science lab. The library collection began to expand rapidly in November 1887 when the college was selected to become Florida's first repository for federal government documents. The U.S. Government would send about 600 volumes to the library within the next two years.

DeLand University was renamed John B. Stetson University in 1889, and was the first university in Florida to employ a full-time librarian. In 1888, Warren Stone Gordis was hired by the university to be a language professor. In addition to teaching Greek and Latin, Gordis found himself charged as the library's manager. While acquainting himself with the materials, Gordis discovered that the library had no traditional classification system; instead, the books were arranged and shelved by subject after being logged into a ledger in the order of their reception. Aware that the expanding library needed a permanent solution, Gordis did some research and decided to employ the dictionary cataloging method and the Dewey Decimal Classification System. Gordis also recognized that the library needed to incorporate periodicals as source material. As he was in charge of building the collection, he designated funds toward the purchase of some of the most prevalent journals of the time, including The Nation Scientific American, North American Review, Atlantic Monthly, the Edinburgh Review, and the London Quarterly Review. Additionally, Gordis trained library assistants to follow correct library procedures and taught students how to locate items in the library.

Sampson Hall: Origins as a "Carnegie Library"

During the late 19th and early 20th centuries, Scottish-American steel magnate and philanthropist Andrew Carnegie was instrumental in the building of free public libraries, as well as a number of university libraries. A library built with donations from the Carnegie Corporation of New York is known as a Carnegie library. A total of 2,509 Carnegie libraries were built worldwide between 1883 and 1929; 1,689 of these were built in the United States; 14 were built in Florida.

One of the four Florida academic libraries funded by Andrew Carnegie was on the Stetson University campus in Deland. The university received $40,000 on March 12, 1906 – the largest Carnegie grant given to a Florida academic library. Elizabeth S. Stetson, wife of John B. Stetson, matched Carnegie's contribution allowing for the Sampson Library to be built. Opening in 1908, it was named after university trustee C.T. Sampson, who was a major donor to the Stetson library fund. Sampson also bequeathed $20,000 to the library for an endowment. Sampson Library was designed by noted Floridian architect Henry John Klutho. Klutho chose to emulate the traditional neoclassic design which distinguished many of America's Carnegie libraries.

In 1964, the duPont-Ball Library became the campus's new main library building. Students, faculty, and staff undertook the task of moving over 100,000 books and other resources from Sampson Hall to the duPont-Ball Library building. Students were encouraged to assist faculty and staff for one hour, but many were willing to stay and help out for the entire day to see the task to completion.

Special programs
A variety of special academic programs are available to students, such as the Roland George Investments Program, where business students manage a real portfolio of more than $2.8 million, the Honors Program, where students and faculty collaborate in an interdisciplinary community, the Nina B. Hollis Institute for Education Reform, which attempts to improve education from preschool through college, the Stetson Institute for Social Research, which provides services to outside agencies, the Family Enterprise Center, offering a major in family business, as well as the Centurion Sales Program providing advanced training in professional sales. Stetson is also the home of the Community Education Project, a higher education in prison program that operates at Tomoka Correctional Institution in Daytona Beach, FL.

Stetson University also offers special programs for students up through ninth grade. Working in collaboration with the Belin-Blank International Center for Gifted Education and Talent Development at the University of Iowa, Stetson University sponsors the HATS (High Achieving Talented Students) Program. HATS serves K–9th grade students who participate in gifted programs or have scored at or above the 95th percentile on any subject area on the FCAT, ITBS, CTBS, or other standardized test. HATS offers Saturday and summer enrichment programs, scholarships, and above-level testing.

International education
Stetson University offers study abroad programs at a number of universities in Spain, France, Germany, Mexico, England, Scotland, Russia, Austria, and China, as well as an option for study in Washington, D.C.

Undergraduate research
In addition to the completion of a "senior thesis" project compulsory for graduation, students have the opportunity to develop their own research projects and be involved in faculty research.  Two distinct programs foster undergraduate research: the SURE (Stetson Undergraduate Research Experience) Grant competition, which provides summer stipends and faculty mentors for selected student research projects; and Stetson Showcase, a day-long event that encourages all undergraduates to share their research with the Stetson community.

Continuing Education
The university offers departments and program that specialize in services to lifelong learners and organizations outside the Stetson community.

 The Elderhostel – or Road Scholar – program allows individuals older than the traditional university age to attend classes on campus and in the region for a week, and offers specialized courses based on the university's curriculum.
 Each February, the departments of Continuing Education and Religious Studies co-host the Florida Winter Pastors’ School, which in 2010 celebrated its 25th anniversary.
 Each summer, week-long Destination Science camps are offered for youth ages 6–11, who attend sessions such as "Robots vs. Aliens" and "'G' Force Rockets and Moon Blasters."
 Stetson Lifelong is a program that provides community residents an educational place for intellectual discussion  and social interaction. Launched at the Celebration campus in 2012.
 Stetson HATS (High Achieving Talented Students) is a year-round academic enrichment program that provides educational opportunities for high-achieving Florida students.

Rankings

Student life

Stetson has approximately 20 honorary academic and professional organizations and over 100 other student organizations on campus, including Phi Beta Kappa (first private university in Florida to be granted a chapter); the Floyd M. Riddick Model United States Senate program; The Reporter, Florida's oldest college newspaper; Model United Nations; Phi Alpha Delta Pre-Law Professional Fraternity; Psi Chi, an international psychology honors fraternity; Alpha Kappa Delta, an international sociology honor society; Alpha Kappa Psi business professional fraternity; Omicron Delta Kappa national leadership fraternity; Poetry at an Uncouth Hour (a poetry reading club); Hatter Harvest (organic community garden); Touchstone, the student literary magazine, and many others.

There are several religious organizations on campus as well, including Baptist Collegiate Fellowship; Catholic Campus Ministry; Wesley House (Methodist Ministry);  Muslim American Student Organization; Hillel, a Jewish student organization; Renown, an interfaith group; and Shield, a Pentecostal organization.

There are also a number of multicultural and social justice organizations on campus, including the Black Student Association, the Hispanic Organization for Latin American Awareness (HOLA), Organization for Students Actively Pursuing Equality (OSAPE), STAND (the student-run branch of the Genocide Intervention Network), and Kaleidoscope (the LGBT alliance on campus).

There is also an Army Reserve Officers' Training Corps (ROTC) unit that students can participate in on-campus through Embry–Riddle Aeronautical University. Successful completion of the ROTC program allows university students to be commissioned in the United States Army as a Second Lieutenant, and requires a post-graduation service commitment.

The Greek Community at Stetson is about twenty-nine percent of the student body being a member of a fraternity or sorority.

There are six Panhellenic social sororities on campus: Alpha Chi Omega, Alpha Xi Delta, Delta Delta Delta, Kappa Alpha Theta, Pi Beta Phi, and Zeta Tau Alpha, two Divine 9 organizations Sigma Gamma Rho and Phi Beta Sigma, and eight IFC social fraternities: Alpha Tau Omega, Delta Sigma Phi, Lambda Chi Alpha, Pi Kappa Alpha, Pi Kappa Phi, Phi Sigma Kappa, Sigma Nu and Sigma Phi Epsilon.

Stetson is also home to chapters from Phi Mu Alpha Sinfonia, a music fraternity for men, and Sigma Alpha Iota, a music fraternity for women.

Movies
Several movies have been filmed on the Stetson campus (and in the City of De Land), including Ghost Story (1981) starring John Houseman and Fred Astaire; The Waterboy starring Adam Sandler; and Walt Before Mickey, starring Thomas Ian Nicholas, Jon Heder and Armando Gutierrez.

Student government
Established in 1908, the Stetson University Student Government Association is the representative and executive decision-making body for all undergraduate students in the Stetson community.
Student governance at Stetson consists of two branches, an executive and a unicameral legislative branch. The executive branch consists of the president, the vice president, the secretary of communication, the secretary of finance, and the secretary of student involvement. The president and vice president are elected annually in the spring.  After installment, the President appoints the secretaries of communication, finance, and student involvement.

Patrick Smith Model United States Senate
Stetson University hosts the nation's first and oldest college-level Model United States Senate program (established in 1970) every year in March. Each year, students from colleges and universities around the nation gather at Stetson for the three-day event. The Model Senate reproduces the actual procedures and activities of the U.S. Senate in an effort to provide experience and education for the student participants. Each student is assigned as a Senator in one of five legislative committees and is responsible for researching a variety of bills, and crafting appropriate amendments. In addition, the Model Senate attracts national speakers and lecturers, including former and sitting U.S. senators.

Athletics

Stetson is a member of the National Collegiate Athletic Association, and the university's 18 intercollegiate men's and women's teams compete on a Division I level in the ASUN Conference, the Pioneer Football League and MAAC – Metro Atlantic Athletic Conference. The school's mascot is "John B.", a stylized version of John B. Stetson, the benefactor for whom the university is named. The basketball, baseball, men's and women's tennis, women's golf, men's and women's soccer, sand volleyball and softball teams have either earned conference championships or gained national rankings or recognition.

One of the high-profile sports at Stetson is baseball. Since 1970, the baseball program has earned seven ASUN Conference championships and 16 trips to the NCAA Regionals. In 2013, women's basketball made its third NCAA tournament appearance. The team won the A-Sun Conference Championship in 2005, 2011, and 2013. Stetson participated in football from 1901 until 1956 achieving an all-time record of 155–127–27 (.545). The football team earned its 100th victory in 1935. In 2010, university officials gathered information and evaluated the feasibility of starting a Football Championship Subdivision (formerly Division I-AA) non-scholarship program. In March 2011, SU President Wendy B. Libby announced the return of Hatters Football. and the addition of women's lacrosse. In July 2011, Stetson named Roger A. Hughes as head football coach. Stetson's sand volleyball team had its inaugural season in 2012, after the sport was officially approved for conference play. In 2013, both the lacrosse  and football teams played their first games.

Stetson's main rivals include Jacksonville University and Florida Gulf Coast University.

Athletic facilities
 The J. Ollie Edmunds Center – basketball and volleyball, 4,000-seat multipurpose arena, athletic offices, weight room
 Athletic Training Center – a $6.7 million complex that opened in August 2012, home to football practice fields, as well as soccer + lacrosse game and practice fields
 Patricia Wilson Softball Field, the 2009 Softball Field of the Year
 The Wilson Athletic Center – sport and exercise science department, fitness and activity rooms
 Mandy Stoll Tennis Center – next to the soccer field
 Melching Field at Conrad Park – baseball stadium (off campus)
 Victoria Hills Golf Club (off campus)
 Hollis Center
 Sandra Stetson Aquatic Center- a $7 million aquatic center, opened in 2019, houses the Men's and Women's Crew teams as well as the Institute for Water and Environmental Resilience.
 Spec Martin Stadium—6,000 seat off campus football stadium

Awards and certifications
Stetson is consistently named by the Corporation for National and Community Service to the President's Higher Education Community Service Honor Roll With Distinction for exemplary service initiatives; in 2014, Stetson was one of only two universities in the country to earn the "With Distinction" recognition in every category of community engagement. 
Awarded a $1.1 million grant from Florida Department of Education, 2014, to partner with Bethune–Cookman University, Volusia County Schools and New Teacher Center to create and launch the Volusia Center for Excellence in Education.
Earned Florida Campus Compact's Most Engaged Campus Award, 2012; Campus-Community Partnership Award, 2013; four individual awards, 2014.
 Ranked one of the top in the South by U.S. News & World Report, 2015.
 Named a "Military-Friendly School", with the School of Business Administration being additionally recognized by Military Times as one of the best in the nation for veterans. 
 Stetson University College of Law ranked first in U.S. for trial advocacy by U.S. News & World Report, 2015.

Notable alumni

Notes

References

Further reading

External links

Stetson University Athletics website

 
Private universities and colleges in Florida
Universities and colleges in Volusia County, Florida
Educational institutions established in 1883
Music schools in Florida
Universities and colleges accredited by the Southern Association of Colleges and Schools
DeLand, Florida
Library buildings completed in 1908
1883 establishments in Florida